Lagenocarpus is a genus of flowering plants belonging to the family Cyperaceae.

Its native range is Tropical America.

Species:

Lagenocarpus adamantinus 
Lagenocarpus alboniger 
Lagenocarpus bracteosus 
Lagenocarpus celiae 
Lagenocarpus clarkei 
Lagenocarpus comatus 
Lagenocarpus compactus 
Lagenocarpus cubensis 
Lagenocarpus distichophyllus 
Lagenocarpus eriopodus 
Lagenocarpus glomerulatus 
Lagenocarpus griseus 
Lagenocarpus guianensis 
Lagenocarpus humilis 
Lagenocarpus junciformis 
Lagenocarpus lanatus 
Lagenocarpus minarum 
Lagenocarpus parvulus 
Lagenocarpus pendulus 
Lagenocarpus polyphyllus 
Lagenocarpus rigidus 
Lagenocarpus sabanensis 
Lagenocarpus sericeus 
Lagenocarpus subaphyllus 
Lagenocarpus triqueter 
Lagenocarpus velutinus 
Lagenocarpus venezuelensis 
Lagenocarpus verticillatus

References

Cyperaceae
Cyperaceae genera